Johnny Mad Dog is a 2008 French/Liberian war film directed by Jean-Stéphane Sauvaire and based on the novel Johnny chien méchant (2002) by the Congolese author Emmanuel Dongala. It tells the story of a group of child soldiers fighting for the Liberians United for Reconciliation and Democracy (LURD) rebels in 2003, during the Second Liberian Civil War.

The film stars Christopher Minie (as Johnny), Daisy Victoria Vandy (as Laokolé), Dagbeh Tweh, Barry Chernoh, Mohammed Sesay and Joseph Duo.

Plot

The teenage rebel Johnny Mad Dog leads the small group of younger boys commanded by the older General Never Die, who feeds them cocaine. The film follows the group's march towards the capital Monrovia, and follows them in a gritty realistic manner as they move through a series of towns and villages, where they terrify and often execute the population. The soldiers are depicted as almost feral, committing acts of pillage and rape, with scant regard for even their own lives. They wear a variety of outlandish outfits – including butterfly wings and a wedding dress – and have nicknames such as No Good Advice, Captain Dust to Dust, and Chicken Hair.

Production
The actors were mostly aged 10 to 15, including Christopher Minie, Daisy Victoria Vandy, Dagbeh Tweh, Barry Chernoh, Mohammed Sesay, and Joseph Duo. All were unknowns when cast; some were themselves former child soldiers.

References

External links 
 
 
 

2000s political drama films
2008 films
Anti-war films
French war drama films
French political drama films
Films about child soldiers
Films about war crimes
Films shot in Liberia
Films based on novels
Liberian drama films
English-language French films
English-language Liberian films
2000s war drama films
2008 drama films
Films directed by Jean-Stéphane Sauvaire
2000s French films